The West Indies cricket team toured Pakistan in April 2018 to play three Twenty20 International (T20I) matches. Pakistan won the series 3–0. Following the conclusion of the series, Pakistan's captain Sarfaraz Ahmed said that "no team will be using security concerns as an excuse in the future. This year or the next year, (international) cricket will come back to Pakistan". The Pakistan Cricket Board (PCB) are hoping to play a full international series against a Full Member side in Pakistan by 2020.

It was the first tour in Pakistan of more than one match against another Test nation since Zimbabwe toured in May 2015. In October 2017, Sri Lanka played a T20I match against Pakistan in Lahore.

Originally, the fixtures were scheduled to be played in November 2017. However, early in November 2017, reports announced that the West Indies team would not be travelling to Pakistan over security concerns. The PCB chairman Najam Sethi stated that the original schedule was changed due to unforeseen weather, logistic issues and challenges with security. In March 2018, the PCB confirmed that the fixtures would take place in April at the National Stadium in Karachi. The last time an international cricket match was played at the venue in Karachi was in February 2009, when Sri Lanka toured Pakistan. That series was cut short, following an attack on the Sri Lanka cricket team.

Cricket West Indies (CWI) offered an extra pay incentive to players to tour Pakistan. With only three days left before the tour started, the West Indies named a weakened squad to tour Pakistan. Jason Mohammed was named as captain of the West Indies, as the regular T20I captain, Carlos Brathwaite did not travel because of security concerns. Along with Brathwaite, Jason Holder, Chris Gayle and Devendra Bishoo did not make themselves available, also because of security concerns.

Squads

Veerasammy Permaul injured himself during the first match and was ruled out of the West Indies squad for the remaining two fixtures. No replacement was named to replace him.

T20I series

1st T20I

2nd T20I

3rd T20I

References

External links
 Series home at ESPN Cricinfo

2018 in Pakistani cricket
2018 in West Indian cricket
International cricket competitions in 2017–18
West Indian cricket tours of Pakistan